Wang Yajun, may refer to:

 Wang Yajun (diplomat)
 Wang Yajun (volleyball player)